Rhyd Meirionnydd (wrongly spelt: Rhyd-meirionydd) is a small village in the  community of Genau'r-glyn, Ceredigion, Wales, which is 77.3 miles (124.3 km) from Cardiff and 179.7 miles (289.2 km) from London. Rhyd-meirionydd is represented in the  Senedd by Elin Jones (Plaid Cymru) and is part of the Ceredigion constituency in the House of Commons.

References

See also
List of localities in Wales by population

Villages in Ceredigion